Ángel Gómez may refer to:

 Ángel Gómez (cyclist), Spanish cyclist
 Ángel Gómez (footballer, born 1985), Argentine midfielder
 Ángel Gómez (footballer, born 1994), Paraguayan forward
 Ángel Gómez (footballer, born 2001), Argentine midfielder